With Honor Fund is an American independent expenditure-only committee (a.k.a. “super PAC”) registered with the Federal Election Commission, led by military veterans and focused on electing next-generation military veterans to create a more effective government.

With Honor Fund's mission is to elect principled next-generation veterans to office who will work in a non-partisan way to create a more effective and less polarized government.

History 
Rye Barcott, David Gergen, Peter Dixon, and other veterans co-founded With Honor Fund in 2017 to support a surge of more than 150 younger veterans who answered the call to serve again and ran for U.S. House of Representative seats from both parties in 2018. With the help of With Honor Fund, 19 military veterans, nine Republicans, and ten Democrats won elections to the U.S. House.

Pledge 
With Honor Fund will support a select group of veteran candidates who take The With Honor Pledge "to put principles before politics, and lead with civility, integrity, and courage, including the courage to take specific actions like meeting with someone from another party at least once a month and sponsoring legislation with a member of another party at least once a year."

Press 
With Honor Fund's disruptive political effort has been covered by MSNBC's Morning Joe, Fox News' Fox & Friends, The Atlantic, and other media. Admiral Michael Mullen and Elliot Ackerman authored an op-ed in USA Today announcing With Honor Fund's first slate of candidate endorsements. Former senators Richard Lugar and Tom Daschle wrote in U.S. News & World Report about With Honor Fund and new research by The Lugar Center illustrating how veterans in Congress have historically been more bi-partisan than non-veterans.

References 

United States political action committees